The 2018–19 Cincinnati Bearcats men's basketball team represented the University of Cincinnati in the 2018–19 NCAA Division I men's basketball season. The Bearcats were  led by 13th-year head coach Mick Cronin, and played its home games at the newly renovated Fifth Third Arena as members of the American Athletic Conference. They finished the season 28–7, 14–4 in AAC play, finishing in second place. They defeated SMU, Wichita State, and No. 1 seed Houston to win the AAC tournament for the second consecutive year, and received the conference's automatic bid to the NCAA tournament. As the No. 7 seed in the South region, they were upset by No. 10 seed Iowa in the first round.

Previous season
The Bearcats finished the 2016–17 season 31–5, 16–2 in AAC play to win the regular season championship. They defeated SMU, Memphis, and Houston to win the AAC tournament and received the conference's automatic bid to the NCAA tournament. As the No. 2 seed in the West region, they defeated Georgia State in the First Round before being upset by Nevada in the Second Round.

Offseason

Departing players 

On September 13, 2018 Associate Head Coach Larry Davis resigned before the start of the season. In October, Greg Youncofski was named as the third assistant coach for the 2018-19 season.

Recruiting class of 2018

Preseason

AAC media poll
The AAC media poll was released on October 15, 2018, with the Bearcats predicted to finish second in the AAC.

Preseason Awards
American Athletic Conference
All-AAC First Team - Jarron Cumberland

Lindy's Sports
All-Conference First Team - Jarron Cumberland

Athlon Sports
All-AAC First Team - Jarron Cumberland

Street & Smith's
All-Conference - Jarron Cumberland
All-Newcomer - Rashawn Fredricks

Roster

Depth chart

Source

Schedule and results
The Bearcats had a pre-season tour in Canada, playing three teams on the trip. The Bearcats will reopen Fifth Third Arena against Ohio State on November 7, 2018.

|-
!colspan=12 style=|Exhibition

|-
!colspan=12 style=| Non-conference regular season
|-

|-
!colspan=12 style=| AAC Regular Season

|-
!colspan=12 style=| AAC Tournament
|-

|-
!colspan=9 style=| NCAA tournament
|-

Awards and milestones

All-American
Honorable Mention: Jarron Cumberland

American Athletic Conference honors

All-AAC Awards
Player of the Year: Jarron Cumberland

All-AAC First Team
Jarron Cumberland

Player of the Week
Week 3: Jarron Cumberland
Week 7: Jarron Cumberland
Week 10: Jarron Cumberland
Week 11: Jarron Cumberland

Weekly Honor Roll
Week 5: Trevon Scott
Week 9: Jarron Cumberland
Week 12: Jarron Cumberland
Week 13: Jarron Cumberland
Week 14: Jarron Cumberland
Week 15: Cane Broome
Week 16: Jarron Cumberland

AAC Tournament honors

AAC Tournament MVP
Jarron Cumberland

All Tournament Team
Jarron Cumberland
Trevon Scott

Source

Rankings

*AP does not release post-NCAA tournament rankings

References

Cincinnati
Cincinnati Bearcats men's basketball seasons
Cincinnati Bearcats men's basketball
Cincinnati Bearcats men's basketball
Cincinnati